Complete is the first full-length studio album by South Korean boy group, BTOB. It was released on June 29, 2015. The album contains 13 tracks including a previously released bonus track "Shake It" from their fifth mini-album, Move, and an acoustic version of their debut track "Insane". The group promoted with the title track "It's Okay".

Background and release
On June 4, 2015, Cube Entertainment announced that BTOB will be releasing their first studio album on June 29, 2015. This marks the start of BTOB's 2015 full-scale comeback activities. Ahead of comeback, BTOB notified the 180 degree different transformation of their style compared to previous promotions, with their first ever R&B ballad title-track "It’s Okay". "It's Okay" is expected to be reversal with a different level of BTOB's powerful vocal as weapon. They also stated that this transformation would show a more 'music influenced' side.

"It's Okay" topped multiple music charts after its release, making it BTOB's first single to reach #1 on charts after 3 years of debut.

Promotions
On June 28, BTOB held a live showcase event for "Complete" via Naver Starcast. The group performed "It's Okay" and other tracks from the album for the first time. The group made their first official music show performance on MBC Music's Show Champion, performing the tracks "It's Okay" and "Giddy Up". It was soon followed by performances on KBS's Music Bank, MBC's Show! Music Core and SBS's Inkigayo.

Composition
The album starts off with the a cappella intro "Complete" produced by E.ONE. Followed by the lead single "It's Okay", which is a heartfelt R&B ballad. "Live Well Yourself" is a follow-up song for "It's Okay", and is a piano riff driven track. "My Friend's Girlfriend" is a new jack swing track about the unimaginable conflict between love and loyalty. "I Miss You" is an aggressive track with cute lyrics about the desire to see a loved one. "Giddy Up" is a dance track written by Seo Jae-woo, Big Sancho, Daniel Caesar and Ludwig Lindell. "Open" is a sexy track written and produced by member, Minhyuk. The album also includes an acoustic version of BTOB's debut single, "Insane", and a previously released party track "Shake It". "Shake It" is a disco-style electronic genre. The album ends with the outro by Ilhoon, "Everything's Good" which is a track with gentle flowing melody with piano music.

Music video
The music video for "It's Okay" was released on June 29, on BTOB's Official YouTube Channel. The music video follows a drama-format similar to story-telling. It features the members representing different careers: Ilhoon as a radio DJ, Hyunsik as an art student, Peniel as a firefighter, Sungjae as a hiker, Changsub as a delivery guy, Eunkwang as a student, and Minhyuk as unemployed guy, all struggling to reach their dreams. On July 5, BTOB released a dance version for the music video, after reaching 1 million views for "It's Okay".

Track listing

Chart performance

Release history

References

External links
 
 

Cube Entertainment albums
2015 debut albums